The Masur Museum of Art in Monroe, Louisiana in the United States, is the largest visual arts museum in northeast Louisiana. It is in the former home of the Masur family, the Masur House, also known as the Slagle-Masur House, which is listed on the National Register of Historic Places. The building, constructed in modified Tudor style in 1914, was listed on the National Register in 1982 for its architecture. In 1963 it was given to the city of Monroe by the Masur family.

The mission of the museum is to support and foster visual arts in the community through exhibitions, both temporary and from the museum's permanent collection, as well as providing educational programs for both children and adults. Lectures, films, and artist talks are presented in the Lower River Gallery. The Carriage House is used for art classes, summer art camps, workshops, and demonstrations. Admission to the museum is free.  The permanent collection includes works by Thomas Hart Benton, Mary Cassatt, Philip Guston, Joan Miró, Robert Motherwell, Pablo Picasso, Auguste Rodin.  Salvador Dalí, Alex Katz, Fairfield Porter, and Georges Rouault. The collection also features the work of distinguished artists with ties to Louisiana, namely Lynda Benglis, Clyde Connell, Alexander John Drysdale, John Geldersma, Ida Kohlmeyer, Eugene J. Martin, and George Rodrigue, among others. Also included in the collection are several long-term loans that are on view on a rotating basis. These include works by Marc Chagall, Joan Miró, Pablo Picasso, and Pierre-Auguste Renoir.

History
The Masur Museum of Art was built as a private residence in 1929. A lumberman by the name of Clarence Edward Slagle had the modified Tudor estate built for his wife Mabel Chauvin. The Indiana limestone and Pennsylvania blue slate used to build the home were brought down through various waterways to the scenic Ouachita River, which runs behind the estate. Originally the grounds included an English style rose garden and a lawn extending down to the river. When the Army Corps of Engineers built the levee system in the 1930s, the carriage house was moved behind the new levee and much of the lawn was subsequently lost. 
The Great Depression caused the home to go up for sale in the early 1930s and the Masur family acquired it. Sigmund and Beatrice Masur and their children Sylvian, Jack, and Bertha Marie lived in the home until the 1960s. The Masur children donated the home to the city in December 1963 under the agreement that it become a fine arts museum. The new museum, The Masur Museum of Art, held its first exhibition in September 1964.

The Masur Museum of Art operates as a division of the Department of Community Affairs of the City of Monroe with a mission to provide a quality visual arts experience for the community. The city provides funding for staff salaries and museum maintenance. In 1974, the Twin City Art Foundation was formed to provide additional support for the museum, providing funding for exhibitions, educational programs, and the permanent collection.

References

External links

Houses on the National Register of Historic Places in Louisiana
Houses completed in 1914
Buildings and structures in Monroe, Louisiana
Museums in Ouachita Parish, Louisiana
Museums of American art
Art museums and galleries in Louisiana
Gothic Revival architecture in Louisiana
Houses in Ouachita Parish, Louisiana
National Register of Historic Places in Ouachita Parish, Louisiana
1964 establishments in Louisiana
Museums established in 1964